The Nuclear Age Peace Foundation (NAPF) is a non-profit, non-partisan international education and advocacy organization. Founded in 1982, NAPF is composed of individuals and organizations from all over the world. It has consultative status to the United Nations Economic and Social Council and is recognized by the UN as a Peace Messenger Organization.

About

NAPF’s mission is to "educate, advocate, and inspire action for a just and peaceful world, free of nuclear weapons." Its vision is "a world in which nuclear weapons are abolished; a world where all my flourish."

NAPF engages in advocacy and education programs. Its educational projects include the Sunflower e-newsletter, which provides monthly information and analysis of nuclear and international security issues, and its Nuclear Files, which chronicles the history of nuclear weapons. NAPF works with elected officials and decision-makers around the world to advocate for nuclear weapons abolition.

Nuclear Zero

In 2014, the Nuclear Age Peace Foundation consulted with the Marshall Islands when it filed cases against the nine nuclear-armed countries (United States, United Kingdom, France, Russia, China, Israel, India, Pakistan, North Korea) in the International Court of Justice and U.S. Federal District Court. The lawsuits make the central claim that these nations have failed to comply with their obligations under international law to pursue negotiations aimed at the complete elimination of their nuclear weapons.

Five of the nuclear-armed countries are parties to the Nuclear Non-Proliferation Treaty (NPT). Article VI of the NPT requires that parties "pursue negotiations in good faith" aimed at "complete disarmament." The lawsuits contend that the other four countries, while not bound to the NPT, are obligated by customary international law to pursue nuclear disarmament.

Presenting evidence that all nine nuclear-armed countries continue to update and enhance their nuclear arsenals while failing to take disarmament negotiations seriously, the lawsuits allege that each nuclear-armed country is in breach of its international obligations. The case filed in the U.S. Federal District Court is particularly historic, as it is the first time that the U.S. has been charged in domestic court for violation of an international disarmament treaty. The U.S. government has filed an official "notice of appearance" and has named a legal team to defend it in court.

Advisory Council

Members of NAPF's Advisory Council help spread the organization's message worldwide. Members of the Advisory Council include:

 Hafsat Abiola
 Tadatoshi Akiba
 Rabbi Leonard Beerman
 Harry Belafonte
 Blase Bonpane
 Helen Caldicott
 Noam Chomsky
 Jean-Michel Cousteau
 Tony de Brum
 Michael Douglas
 Riane Eisler
 Jane Goodall
 The 14th Dalai Lama
 Queen Noor of Jordan
 Ted Turner
 Archbishop Desmond Tutu

See also
 Anti-nuclear movement
 Council for a Livable World
 Center for Arms Control and Non-Proliferation

References

External links
Nuclear Age Peace Foundation (Official Website)
Nuclear Zero Campaign
Nuclear Files
U.S. Department of Energy on Nuclear Research and the Universities of California
University of California's involvement in Nuclear Weapons

Foundations based in the United States
Anti–nuclear weapons movement
Organizations established in 1982